Native Window was an American progressive rock spin-off band of the popular rock group Kansas.

American progressive rock groups
2008 establishments in Kansas
Kansas (band)